Adolphe Belem (born 25 November 1998) is an Burkinabé professional footballer who plays as a winger for Adanaspor. He has represented Burkina Faso at youth international level.

Club career
Belem began his career with Rail Club du Kadiogo, making his senior debut at the age of 14. In 2016, he earned a move to Austrian non-league side Union Lembach, scoring ten goals in 12 games. He then moved to Austrian Regionalliga side Union Gurten before making his professional debut for Floridsdorfer AC in the 2. Liga in March 2018. In August 2020, Belem joined TFF First League side Adanaspor.

International career
Belem has represented Burkina Faso at under-18 level.

References

External links

1998 births
Living people
Burkinabé footballers
Association football wingers
Sportspeople from Ouagadougou
Rail Club du Kadiogo players
Burkinabé Premier League players
Austrian Regionalliga players
Floridsdorfer AC players
2. Liga (Austria) players
Adanaspor footballers
TFF First League players
Burkinabé expatriate footballers
Expatriate footballers in Turkey
Burkinabé expatriate sportspeople in Turkey
Burkina Faso youth international footballers
21st-century Burkinabé people
Burkina Faso under-20 international footballers